Mosely is a family name. Notable people with the name include:

 Edward Mosely, the collector of the Mosely Collection of stamps which is now on exhibition in the British Library Philatelic Collections
 Martin Ephraim Mosely (1877-1948), English entomologist
 Merv Mosely, American football player
 Peter Mosely, an American musician
 Robert Mosely, American singer and songwriter known for writing "Sha-La-La" and "Midnight Flyer" 
 Semie Mosely, American guitar maker and founder of Mosrite Guitars
 Detective Mosely, a fictional character from the Gabriel Knight game series

See also
Moseley (surname)
Mosley (surname)
Mozley, surname